Elisha Hunt (1779–1873) was the principal entrepreneur behind the Monongahela and Ohio Steam Boat Company that built the historic steamboat Enterprise.

Early life
Elisha Hunt was born on October 7, 1779 in Moorestown, New Jersey to Joshua and Esther Hunt, the former Esther Roberts.

In September 1790, Joshua, Esther, Elisha and his four siblings, "with two wagons, seven horses, one cow, and provisions", began a three-week journey to Fayette County in southwestern Pennsylvania. Their destination was a small, but growing, community located on the east bank of the Monongahela River in close proximity to Fort Burd. In those days it was called Redstone Old Fort, or simply Redstone. Later, the name was changed to Brownsville.

Salem, Ohio
On May 23, 1827, a certificate from Redstone Monthly Meeting, Brownsville, Pennsylvania requesting membership for Elisha, Mary and Emmor Hunt was accepted by Salem Monthly Meeting, Salem, Ohio.

On September 28, 1831, a certificate from Salem Monthly Meeting, Salem, Ohio requesting membership for Elisha and Mary Hunt was accepted by Redstone Monthly Meeting, Brownsville, Pennsylvania.

Notes

References
 Encyclopedia of American Quaker Genealogy (EAQG), Vol I-VI, 1607-1943
 Horn, W. F. [ed.] (1945), The Horn papers: early western movement on the Monongahela and upper Ohio, 1765–1795, volume 3, Scottsdale, PA: Herald Press
 Roberts-Hunt Family Papers, Friends Historical Library of Swarthmore College, Swarthmore, Pennsylvania
 The Friend (1873), "Esther Collins and Ann Edwards", The Friend, a religious and literary journal, Volume XLVI, No. 46 and 47, Philadelphia: William H. Pile, pp. 362, 370-3
 Henshaw, Marc Nicholas (2014). "Hog chains and Mark Twains: a study of labor history, archaeology, and industrial ethnography of the steamboat era of the Monongahela Valley 1811-1950." Dissertation, Michigan Technological University
 Hunter, Louis C. (1949). Steamboats on the western rivers, an economic and technological history. Cambridge, Massachusetts: Harvard University Press, 1949; reprint, New York: Dover Publications, 1993.
 Hynes, Judy, et al. (1997), The descendants of John and Elizabeth (Woolman) Borton, Mount Holly, New Jersey: John Woolman Memorial Association, pp. 23–4
 Shourds, Thomas (1876). History and genealogy of Fenwick's Colony, New Jersey. Bridgeton, New Jersey: 314–20. 
 Woodward, E. M. (1883), History of Burlington County, New Jersey, with biographical sketches of many of its pioneers and prominent men, Philadelphia: Everts & Peck, pp. 270–1

External links
Find A Grave Memorial for Elisha Hunt

1779 births
1873 deaths